Against the Wind is a 1978 Australian television miniseries. It is a historical drama portraying both the British rule of Ireland, and the development of New South Wales and Australia.

Jon English won the Logie Award in 1979 for "Best New Talent" for his role in the miniseries as "Jonathan Garrett". It was the first major Australian TV production to be broadcast in the United States.

A soundtrack was also released, topping the charts in Norway and reaching the top 10 in Australia and Sweden.

Plot
Set during Australia's colonial era over the period 1798–1812, the series follows the life of Mary Mulvane, a daughter of an Irish school master. At 18, she is transported to New South Wales for a term of seven years after attempting to take back her family's milk cow which had been seized by the British "in lieu of tithes" to the local proctor. She endures the trial of a convict sea journey to New South Wales and years of service as a convict before her emancipation and life as a free citizen. During the journey out she makes a lifelong friend of fellow Irish convict, Polly, and in the course of the series we see their friendship continue, Polly's relationship and life with taverner Will Price develop, and Mary's relationship with Jonathan Garrett grows, leading to eventual marriage when both have served their term. Together they face the difficulties of establishing a farm and a young family in the new country, and must deal with the tyranny of the corrupt military running the colony.
It is based on factual events of the Garrett Family (as stated in every episode) and the last episode recites what became of the Garretts: they had 5 children and now have many descendants.

Cast
 Mary Larkin as Mary Mulvane / Mary Garrett
 Kerry McGuire as Polly McNamara
 Jon English as Jonathan Garrett
 Warwick Sims as Ensign Greville
 Frank Gallacher as Will Price
 Fred Parslow as Captain Wiltshire
 Gerard Kennedy as Dinny O'Byrne
 Hu Price as Jonas Pike
 Lynn Rainbow as Louisa Wiltshire
 Charles Gilroy as Amos
 Julia Blake as Cook
 Bryan Brown as Michael Connor
 Jim Danton as Thief

Episodes
 "The Seeds of Fire": Ireland in 1796–97 is seething with rebellion and suppression. Mary is arrested and convicted of theft. She is sentenced to seven years of transportation to New South Wales.
 "The Wild Geese": February 1797—Mary departs Cork for Sydney, meets Polly and survives the long journey to Sydney.
 "A Question of Guilt": May 1797—Mary arrives at Westbury Farm near Parramatta. Polly takes up with Will Price in his country pub.
 "The Flogging Parson": June 1797—Polly prospers with Will. Mary moves up in the farm pecking order.
 "An Agreement Between Officers and Others": The officers conspire to remove the head overseer and retain free use of convict labour.
 "A House on the Hill": There are many events but the most important one is the marriage of Mary and Jonathan.
 "The Tree of Liberty": Disgruntlement against the NSW Corps and government is rife among the convicts and freed settlers.
 "When Kings Go Forth to Battle": The Battle of Vinegar Hill near Parramatta ends badly for the rebels. Martial law is established.
 "The Farmer's Friend": A farm is foreclosed upon. Martial law is suspended.
 "A Matter of Life and Death": Mary gives birth amid much drama. Jonathan goes to jail.
 "The Spirit of Enterprise": Jonathan struggles to profit from his harvest, but Will comes up with a solution.
 "The Whip Hand": After the illegal still is discovered, Polly must give evidence against Will.
 "The Windfall Summer": Polly and Mary both struggle while Jonathan and Will serve time.

Production
The series was the idea of Bronwyn Binns (née Fackerell), who had grown up in President Road, Kellyville, New South Wales, where she had found old convict remnants on the family land. Kellyville is not far from the site of the colonial Vinegar Hill uprising also known as the Castle Hill convict rebellion. Bronwyn worked as a researcher at Crawford Productions and had developed the project over a number of months, She teamed up with Crawford's colleague Ian Jones and presented it to Channel Seven, who agreed to finance a series.

The series was filmed at Old Sydney Town (near Gosford), and at Belgrave Heights, Warrandyte, Colac, Geelong and Emu Bottom. It had a budget of over a million dollars and was the first Australian mini series for a number of years.

Reception
The series was a large ratings success, being the second most popular show on Australia that year, being seen by 2,174,000 people in four cities. It ushered in the cycle of Australian mini series.
It was also broadcast and very popular in Czechoslovakia under the name Proti vetru (Against the Wind) with dubbing in Czech. The series was broadcast in Iran as well, where it was dubbed in Persian with the title "Dar barabar-e bad" (در برابر باد) (Against the Wind) and became very popular.

Music

A soundtrack was released by Polydor Records. "Six Ribbons" was released as a single,  peaking at number one on the Norwegian charts in 1981.

Other media
The complete series is now available on DVD in Australia, Norway, Sweden and the Netherlands in PAL format. It is also available in North American format.

Episodes 1, 8, and 13 were published in book form in 1978.

Notes

References

 "The Dictionary of Performing Arts in Australia — Theatre . Film . Radio . Television — Volume 1" — Ann Atkinson, Linsay Knight, Margaret McPhee — Allen & Unwin Pty. Ltd., 1996
 "The Australian Film and Television Companion" — compiled by Tony Harrison — Simon & Schuster Australia, 1994

External links

1970s Australian television miniseries
Television series set in the 1790s
Irish-Australian culture
Irish Diaspora films
Television shows set in Ireland
Seven Network original programming
Television shows set in New South Wales
1978 Australian television series debuts
1978 Australian television series endings
1970s Australian drama television series
Films directed by George T. Miller
Films directed by Simon Wincer
Historical television series
Television shows set in colonial Australia
Television series set in the 1800s
Television series set in the 1810s